The 1999–2000 Croatian First Football League was the ninth season of the Croatian First Football League, the national championship for men's association football teams in Croatia, since its establishment in 1992. The season started on 24 July 1999 and ended on 13 May 2000. Dinamo Zagreb (Croatia Zagreb in fall season) were the defending champions, having won their ninth championship title the previous season, and they defended the title again, after a win against Rijeka on 6 May 2000.

Teams

Stadia and locations

League table

Results

Matches 1–22 
During matches 1–22 each team plays every other team twice (home and away).

Matches 23–33 
During matches 23–33 each team plays every other team once.

Top goalscorers

See also 
 1999–2000 Croatian Second Football League
 1999–2000 Croatian Football Cup

External links 
 Season statistics at HRNogomet
 1999–2000 in Croatian Football at Rec.Sport.Soccer Statistics Foundation

Croatian Football League seasons
Cro
Drug